The Wretched Ones are an American punk band from Midland Park, New Jersey, United States. They had formerly belonged to The Burnt and The Wretched. Early in the 1990s, their song "Oi! Rodgers" had a modest underground success.

Discography

Albums

EPs

Compilations

External links
 Headache Records - label website

Rock music groups from New Jersey
Street punk groups